Fra Paolino da Pistoia OP (1490 – August 3, 1547) was an Italian painter of the Renaissance period, active in Tuscany. He was a son of the painter Bernardino del Signoraccio. He was a  Dominican friar who painted in a style similar to Fra Bartolomeo.

He painted religious paintings, and was mentioned by Vasari in his Vite as an heir of Fra Bartolomeo. He joined the Dominican order at the age of 57. One of his works can be found in the church of San Paolo di Pistoia.

References
Sources

Notes

1490 births
1547 deaths
People from Pistoia
16th-century Italian painters
Italian male painters
Painters from Tuscany
Italian Renaissance painters
Italian Dominicans